General elections were held in Belize on 5 March 2003. Belizeans elected 29 members to the House of Representatives for a term of five years. The result was a victory for the ruling People's United Party (PUP), which won 22 of the 29 seats.

Background 
The PUP were seeking a second consecutive term in office after recording significant development in the economy from 1998 to 2003. Their opponents, the UDP, sought to replace them in office because of charges of corruption and mismanagement of public funds. Previous to this election, the parties had alternated their time in office since independence.

As an aside, municipal elections had originally been called for this date, creating a situation of triple elections in one day, a first for the Caribbean region according to Myrtle Palacio of the EBD.

As a postscript, Cayo South winner Agripino Cawich Sr. died of illness in August 2003. UDP candidate John Saldivar, who had lost to Cawich in March, won the subsequent by-election over son Joaquin Cawich in October.

This general election was also the first in Belizean history in which former Prime Minister George Cadle Price was not a candidate. Price, who stood down from the Pickstock constituency, had contested every prior general election since 1954, winning each time except 1984.

After what Prime Minister Said Musa called a "drawn-out" campaign that he said affected the country's ability to function, Musa called a house meeting on January 24, 2003 and formally announced that he had asked Governor General Sir Colville Young to dissolve the National Assembly of Belize by February 4, decree nomination of candidates for elections on February 17, and call elections on March 5.

Elections were called early; they had not been constitutionally due until at least November 2003. The Opposition UDP, led by attorney Dean Barrow and eager to recover from the disastrous 1998 campaign, declared themselves ready to battle. Governor General Young officially issued the proclamation dissolving the House on February 4, as requested by Mr. Musa.

Campaign
The People's United Party had nominated candidates through much of 2001 and 2002. Among the more hotly contested races was Pickstock, where Attorney General and Senator Godfrey Smith defeated Bobby Usher of the PUP old guard. A number of other sitting members declared that they would not run again, including Jorge Espat in Freetown (relieved by Francis Fonseca) and Henry Canton in Stann Creek West (replaced by Rodwell Ferguson). The PUP prepared a visually oriented campaign, stressing their accomplishments in office as the governing party and citing weak links in the UDP armor.

The United Democratic Party's selection process was rife with controversy. In May 2002, Pickstock standard bearer and musician Kenny Morgan was removed (he would eventually be replaced by Diane Haylock). Attorney Wilfred Elrington contested Pickstock independently after running into party officials over Haylock's appointment; brother Hubert, who had already left the party, likewise contested independently in Lake Independence against the sitting Cordel Hyde. Another bone of contention was Albert, where the UDP selected Marilyn Williams over Sydney Fuller. Fuller ran independently but Williams was herself the subject of investigation over allegations that she was a U.S. citizen and therefore ineligible to participate in the elections.
Representatives in Lake Independence and Belize Rural Central were also replaced.

This was the first election for the We the People Reform Movement, which put up candidates in Corozal, Orange Walk and Belize District. Independents appeared in all six districts. The election was tagged as featuring the highest number of independent candidates ever, including former UDP candidate Wilfred Elrington in Pickstock. Elrington finished second to winner Godfrey Smith but doubled up UDP choice Diane Haylock.

The 2003 general election can be considered one of the most glitzy and packaged. The PUP ran a mostly upbeat campaign, focusing on celebrating the works achieved in its five years in office. The campaign was highlighted by the release of a CD of political campaign songs written by prominent Belizeans, particularly "Welcome to the Party" by Supa G. "Party" saw three translations and numerous airings over the course of two months of campaigning, invariably accompanied by PUP officials smiling and making contact with their constituents.

The UDP chose substance over style in a realist campaign. Their commercials and statements attacked what they saw as latent corruption in the PUP's governing of the country. In February a broadside of scandals rocked the retiring administration, in sectors as varied as transport and education, and the UDP pushed every single one as an indication of the things the UDP would not tolerate if elected.

We The People and other independent candidates stressed their belief that the system needed to change and that overall life needed to be improved for all Belizeans. The independents were not as heavily represented on the media but saw their opportunities as they came.

Conduct
The elections were supervised by the Elections and Boundaries Department, headed by Chief Elections Officer Myrtle Palacio and her four person administrative staff. In preparation for the possibility of general elections and the certainty of municipal elections, the EBD had cleaned out their electoral rolls following the 1998 re-registration exercise, sought to boost voter confidence through the media, and trained fellow civil servants across the country to prepare for the rigorous test of conducting three separate elections in one day.

The EBD commanded 1,432 election workers, 567 municipal, 865 general. The workers were divided according to post: returning officer (in charge of the station and vote), election clerks and assistants, presiding officers (at each polling area), poll clerks and assistants, and counting clerks. Statutory Instruments Nos. 14 and 43 of 2003 respectively guaranteed voters the right to register up to February 10, 2003 in lieu of nomination day and allowed for more counting agents assigned to the general elections.

On election day itself, despite the usual early headaches, voting went smoothly. Palacio noted in her end of year report that no petitions for recounts were presented for any election. Nevertheless, The Guardian newspaper of March 16 saw an article written by then member of the Elections and Boundaries Commission and editor Herbert Panton, which criticized the electoral process. For more, see the Guardian article.

A number of media houses joined forces to cover wire-to-wire the events of March 5. Great Belize Television (Channel 5) announced a partnership with RSV Media Center, headlined by LOVE FM, on January 13, 2003. Their coverage used the tagline "Decision 2003."

Later on, Tropical Vision Limited Channel 7 teamed up with fledgling Krem Television and Radio. Their coverage was nicknamed "The Moment" and used "Lose Yourself" by Eminem as its theme song.

Election day began at 5:00 am for workers and 7:00 AM for voters. Voters participated from 7:00 AM to 6:00 PM; counting began at 8:00 PM. Palacio reported that Pickstock's result, a victory for Godfrey Smith, was the first official result to come in, at 10:00 PM. By 12:45 AM Thursday morning, the PUP had amassed the majority fifteen seats, and by 1:10 AM could start celebrating as the CEO stamped the particulars. While the UDP had regained 6% of votes over the 1998 results, the PUP still beat them 53-45.

Results

By constituency

References

Belize
Belize
Legislative election
General elections in Belize